Dan (Serbian Cyrillic: Дан,) is a daily newspaper published in Montenegro. It took its name from the old day Cetinje monthly newspaper that was published in the old Montenegrin state at the beginning of the 20th century. As of 2009 it held the second place after Vijesti with a share of an estimated 31,6% of the country's total readers.

History and profile

Dan newspaper
The first issue of Dan appeared on 31 December 1999. Right from its start, Dan was one of the harshest critics of Milo Đukanović's regime in Montenegro. In May 2001, as Croatian magazine Nacional) began a series of articles and insider interviews on state-sponsored cigarette smuggling in Montenegro under Djukanovic's regime, Dan was the only media outlet in the country to bring the details of the 'Nacional affair' to the Montenegrin public.

Assassination and violence
On 27 May 2004 Dan founder and editor-in-chief Duško Jovanović was assassinated on a Podgorica street in front of the paper's offices. Even though a prolonged police investigation produced a couple of arrests, along with an immediate assassin-suspect currently on trial, the individuals behind the murder have still not been identified. It is alleged that the DPS-controlled government both sponsored and covered up the event. Furthermore, on 11 July 2005, an unidentified male left an explosive device in front of the paper's Podgorica offices. However it did not detonate.

On 3 June 2006, Montenegrin state prosecutor Vesna Medenica decided to press charges against Dan columnist Dragan Rosandić due to the first post-referendum text in his regular column. The charge claims that through his piece Prokleta avlija, Rosandić "exposed to ridicule the peoples, national and ethnic groups of Montenegro that voted for Montenegrin independence". The charges were later dropped as unfounded.

Other media
In addition to the daily "Dan", publisher "Jumedia Mont" also includes the weekly "Revija D" newsmagazine, as well as two radio stations: "Radio D" and Radio "D plus", which in recent years have gained a lot of audience and popularity in Montenegro.

References

Publications established in 1999
Dan